The UEFA Women's Euro 2013 qualifying – Group 7 was contested by five teams competing for one spot for the final tournament.

Standings

Fixtures
All times are UTC+2.

Goalscorers
9 goals
 Pernille Harder

6 goals
 Nina Burger

5 goals
 Irena Martínková

4 goals
 Sanne Troelsgaard
 Andrea Rodrigues

3 goals

 Laura Feiersinger
 Petra Divišová
 Line Røddik

2 goals

 Adéla Pivoňková
 Markéta Ringelová
 Nanna Christiansen
 Nadia Nadim
 Theresa Nielsen
 Kristine Pedersen
 Edite Fernandes
 Carolina Mendes
 Laura Luis

1 goal

 Gohar Armenyan
 Ani Ghukasyan
 Verena Aschauer
 Maria Gstöttner
 Cornelia Haas
 Marlies Hanschitz
 Nadine Prohaska
 Sarah Puntigam
 Daniela Tasch
 Nikola Danihelková
 Veronika Hoferková
 Lucie Martínková
 Iva Mocová
 Jana Sedláčková
 Julie Rydahl Bukh
 Line Jensen
 Katrine Pedersen
 Katrine Veje
 Melissa Antunes
 Kimberly Brandão
 Carole Costa
 Carla Couto
 Sónia Matias
 Cláudia Neto

References
Group 7

7
2011–12 in Austrian football
2012–13 in Austrian football
2011–12 in Danish women's football
2012–13 in Danish women's football
2011–12 in Portuguese women's football
2012–13 in Portuguese women's football
2011–12 in Armenian football
2012–13 in Armenian football
2011–12 in Czech football
2012–13 in Czech football
qualifying